Grammoptera ustulata is a species of beetle in family Cerambycidae. It is found in the Palearctic   (Europe, Caucasus, Transcaucasia, Turkey  )

It is a small longicorn 5 – 9 mm.long. Adults are found feeding at Crataegus and other flowers in Spring and Summer. The larvae develop in fungi infested (especially Vuilleminia comedens branches of deciduous trees .

References

External links
Cerambycidae

Lepturinae
Beetles described in 1783